Lullaby of Birdland is a live album by saxophonist Lee Konitz featuring pianist Barry Harris which was recorded at Birdland in 1991 and released on the Candid label.

Critical reception 

The Allmusic review stated "Konitz and Harris have not crossed paths all that often through the years but they joined forces for an engagement at Birdland in 1991. ... The two stylists mix together just fine. Konitz's sweet/sour tone and melancholy moods are joyfully uplifted by Harris' mastery of bebop".

Track listing 
 "Lullaby of Birdland" (George Shearing) – 9:05
 "This Is Always" (Harry Warren, Mack Gordon) – 7:44
 "Anthropology" (Dizzy Gillespie, Charlie Parker) – 7:53
 "Ask Me Now" (Thelonious Monk) – 9:54
 "East of the Sun" (Brooks Bowman) – 6:23
 "Cherokee" (Ray Noble) – 7:28
 "'Round Midnight" (Monk) – 8:38
 "The Song Is You" (Jerome Kern, Oscar Hammerstein II) – 5:56

Personnel 
Lee Konitz – alto saxophone
Barry Harris – piano
Calvin Hill – bass
Leroy Williams – drums

References 

Lee Konitz live albums
1994 live albums
Candid Records live albums